Božo Anđelić (born 16 March 1992) is a Montenegrin handball player for Al-Qurain and the Montenegrin national team.

References

External links

1992 births
Living people
Montenegrin male handball players
Sportspeople from Cetinje
Expatriate handball players
Montenegrin expatriate sportspeople in Hungary
Montenegrin expatriate sportspeople in North Macedonia
Montenegrin expatriate sportspeople in Sweden
RK Crvena zvezda players